VA-97 has the following meanings:
Attack Squadron 97 (U.S. Navy)
State Route 97 (Virginia)